The  Canoas River (Portuguese, Rio Canoas) is a river of Santa Catarina state in southeastern Brazil. With a length of 570 kilometres, the river joins the Pelotas River to form the Uruguay River.

See also
List of rivers of Santa Catarina

References

 Map from Ministry of Transport

Rivers of Santa Catarina (state)
Tributaries of the Uruguay River